El Bulli Foundation, often stylized as elbullifoundation is a project of Ferran Adrià, Juli Soler and Albert Adrià that continues El Bulli's legacy subsequent to its closure as a restaurant. The Foundation's headquarters are in Barcelona, Spain, but one of the exhibit spaces is in Girona, Spain within El Bulli 1846, on the site of the restaurant.

LA Bulligrafía
LA Bulligrafía, sometimes spelled, LABulligrafía is an archive of the restaurant's history and significance in shaping fine dining from its beginnings as a beach bar in 1962 through its closure. When completed, the archive will consist of information available online and a physical museum sometimes referred to as "El Modelo".

La Bulligrafía is slated to open in 2021 or 2022 in a factory space outside Barcelona, in L'Hospitalet de Llobregat where the brothers were born.

Travelling exhibits
The Foundation has also funded exhibits about the brothers' culinary legacy, including "Ferran Adria: The Invention of Food" at St. Petersburg, Florida's Dali Museum in 2016.

References

External links

Food and drink in Spain
Foundations based in Spain